The 1935 South American Championship was the thirteenth edition of the football tournament, held from 6–27 January 1935 in Lima, Peru, used for Argentina, Chile, Peru, and Uruguay to qualify for the 1936 Summer Olympics. Brazil, Bolivia and Paraguay withdrew from the tournament.

There was some doubt the tournament would take place as during the 1930 FIFA World Cup, where Uruguay defeated Argentina, 4–2 in the final match, Argentina broke off football relations with their Uruguayan counterparts, claiming to have been heavily pressured, and that aggressions had been directed at them, before and during the tournament.

Six years after the previous edition, it was decided to continue the tournament. The tournament itself did not have a trophy in dispute.

Squads
For a complete list of participating squads see: 1935 South American Championship squads

Venues

Final round
Each team played three matches. Two points were awarded for a win, one point for a draw and no points for a loss.

Result

Goal scorers

4 goals
  Herminio Masantonio

3 goals
  Aníbal Ciocca

2 goals

  Diego García
  Héctor Castro

1 goal

  Arturo Arrieta
  Miguel Angel Lauri
  Arturo Carmona
  Carlos Giúdice
  Teodoro Fernández
  Alberto Montellanos
  José A. Taboada

External links
 South American Championship 1935 at RSSSF

 
1935
1935
1935 in South American football
1935 in Peruvian football
1935 in Argentine football
1935 in Uruguayan football
1935 in Chilean sport
January 1935 sports events
Sports competitions in Lima
1930s in Lima